Viviers is the name or part of the name of several communes in France:

 Viviers, Ardèche, in the Ardèche département, capital of the Vivarais
 Roman Catholic Diocese of Viviers, Ardèche
 Viviers, Moselle, in the Moselle département
 Viviers, Yonne, in the Yonne département
 Viviers-du-Lac, in the Savoie département
 Viviers-le-Gras, in the Vosges département
 Viviers-lès-Lavaur, in the Tarn département
 Viviers-lès-Montagnes, in the Tarn département
 Viviers-lès-Offroicourt, in the Vosges département
 Viviers-sur-Artaut, in the Aube département
 Viviers-sur-Chiers, in the Meurthe-et-Moselle département

People
Viviers is also a surname, including that of:
 Casper Viviers (born 1988), Namibian rugby union player

See also
Vivier (disambiguation)